Benjamin John Fawcett   (born 31 December 1990) is an Australian wheelchair rugby player and member of the national wheelchair rugby team. He won a gold medal at the 2016 Rio Paralympics as a member of the Australian Steelers and also went to the 2020 Summer Paralympics.

Personal
Fawcett was born on December 31, 1990. At the age of 18, a snowboard accident in New Zealand led to him becoming a quadriplegic. He lives in Bacchus Marsh, Victoria.

Wheelchair rugby
Whilst undertaking rehabilitation in Australia, he was introduced to wheelchair rugby. He was named Australian Rookie of the Year in 2012 and made his international debut for Australian Steelers in 2013 at the tri-series between Australia, New Zealand, and the United States.

He was a member of the team that retained its gold medal at the 2016 Rio Paralympics after defeating the United States 59–58 in the final. He was awarded the Order of Australia Medal in 2017.

At the 2018 IWRF World Championship in Sydney, Australia, he was a member of the Australian team that won the silver medal after being defeated by Japan 61–62 in the gold medal game.

At the 2020 Summer Paralympics, the Steelers finished fourth after being defeated by Japan 52–60 in the bronze medal game. COVID travel restrictions led to Steelers not having a team training since March 2020 prior to Tokyo.

Fawcett won his first world championship gold medal at the 2022 IWRF World Championship in Vejle, Denmark, when Australia defeated the United States .

References

External links

International Paralympic Committee

Living people
1990 births
Australian wheelchair rugby players
Wheelchair rugby players at the 2016 Summer Paralympics
Wheelchair rugby players at the 2020 Summer Paralympics
Medalists at the 2016 Summer Paralympics
Paralympic gold medalists for Australia
Recipients of the Medal of the Order of Australia
Paralympic medalists in wheelchair rugby
Paralympic wheelchair rugby players of Australia